William Bradley may refer to:

 Will Bradley (1912–1989), American musician
 William Bradley (Australian politician) (1881–1957), New South Wales politician
 William Bradley (boxer), South African Olympic boxer
 William Bradley (New South Wales colonial politician) (1800–1868), Australian politician and landholder
 William Bradley (footballer) (1893–?), English football (soccer) player
 William Bradley (giant) (1787–1820), tallest recorded British man
 William Bradley (Royal Navy officer) (1757–1833), naval officer in the first settlement of New South Wales
 William Bradley (painter) (1801–1857), English painter
 William Bradley-King (born 1997), American football player
 William A. Bradley (1794–1867), American politician, mayor of Washington, D.C.
 William Czar Bradley (1782–1867), American politician, United States Representative from Vermont
 William E. Bradley Jr. (1913–2000), first president of the Society for Industrial and Applied Mathematics
 Will H. Bradley (1868–1962), American Art Nouveau illustrator and artist
 William J. Bradley (1852–1916), American businessman and politician from New Jersey
 William Lee Bradley (1918–2007), American scholar of comparative religion, ethics, and theology
 William O'Connell Bradley (1847–1914), American politician, governor of Kentucky and United States senator
 William P. Bradley (1867–1938), lawyer and city councilman in Detroit, Michigan

See also
 Bill Bradley (disambiguation)